Zidaru, meaning "bricklayer", is a Romanian surname. Notable people with the surname include:

Marian Zidaru (born 1956), Romanian artist
Octavian Zidaru (born 1953), Romanian fencer and coach

Romanian-language surnames
Occupational surnames